The American Pediatric Society (APS) is the first pediatric society established in North America.  Created in 1888, the APS pursues a vision of an engaged, inclusive, and impactful community of pediatric thought leaders. The APS mission is to shape the future of academic pediatrics through the engagement of distinguished child health leaders.

Awards and honors
 The John Howland Award, considered the highest honor given by APS, has been awarded since 1952 to honor those who, by their contribution to pediatrics, have aided in its advancement.

See also
 American Academy of Pediatrics
 American College of Pediatricians
 Academic Pediatric Association
 Society for Pediatric Research

References

Medical associations based in the United States
Medical and health organizations based in Texas
1888 establishments in the United States
Presidents of the American Pediatric Society